Cyanopterus is a genus of wasps in the family Braconidae. It is an extant genus but there is at least one fossil species from the Eocene of the United Kingdom.

References

External links 
 

 
 
 Cyanopterus at insectoid.info

Braconidae genera
Braconinae